Campestre de Goiás is a municipality in central Goiás state, Brazil.

Location
There are municipal boundaries with:
north:  Santa Bárbara de Goiás
south:  Guapó
east:  Trindade
west:  Palmeiras de Goiás

Campestre is 56 kilometres west of the state capital, Goiânia and 26 kilometers west of Trindade.  Connections are made by GO-060 / Trindade / GO-050.

Demographic and Political Data
Population density in 2007: 12.46 inhabitants/km2
Population growth rate 2000-2007: 1.07.%
Population in 1980: 2,459
Population in 1991: 2,316
Urban population in 2007: 2,276
Rural population in 2007: 1,135
Eligible voters in 2007: 2,635
City government in 2005: mayor (Selma do Socorro Lemes Manzi), vice-mayor (Roberto José da Costa), and 09 councilmembers

The economy
The economy is based on cattle raising, agriculture, and small retail and transformation units.
Industrial units: 08 (2007)
Retail units:  18
Automobiles: 177 in 2007

Animal raising in 2006
cattle: 30,500 head
dairy cows: 6,600

Agricultural information 2006
Number of farms: 260
Total farm area: 24,226
Planted area: 1,550 ha.
Area of natural pasture: 17,162
Workers in agriculture: 850
Area of rice: 850 ha.
Area of corn: 1,400 ha.

Health in 2007
infant mortality rate in 2000: 25.29
public health clinics: 01
hospitals: none

Education in 2006
literacy rate in 2000: 81.0%
schools: 03
classrooms: 18
teachers: 54
students: 868
higher education: none
Ranking on the Human Development Index:  0.715
State ranking:  189 (out of 242 municipalities)
National ranking:  2,732 (out of 5,507 municipalities)

History
Campestre de Goiás began in 1949 when Dimas and Antônio Viera settled with their families along the banks of the Córrego Campestre.  In 1963 it was raised to a district of Trindade, and in the same year was dismembered to create a new municipality.

See also
List of municipalities in Goiás
Microregions of Goiás

References

Frigoletto

Municipalities in Goiás